Bloomfield, Kentucky, typically refers to the present-day city of that name in Nelson County.

It may also refer to:

 Sharpsburg, Kentucky, in Bath County, formerly known as Bloomfield